Villa Air is a Maldivian airline launched on March 14, 2011. It has its headquarters on the fifth floor of the Villa House in Malé. The airline is operated by Villa Air, a subsidiary company of Villa Group, and began operations on 1 October 2011.  The company slogan is We fly you in style.

Destinations

Villa Air's destinations as of July 2019 include the following airports:

Ari - Villa International Airport Maamigili - VAM - Hub
Maalhosmadulu - Dharavandhoo Airport - DRV
Malé - Velana International Airport - MLE - Base

Villa Air also offers special request flights to the following destinations:

Hanimaadhoo - Hanimaadhoo International Airport - HAQ (from Dharavandhoo Airport)
Kadhdhoo - Kadhdhoo Airport - KDO (from Villa International Airport Maamigili)

Fleet 

The Flyme fleet consists of the following aircraft (as of October 2019):

Retired fleet 

 1 Cessna 208 Amphibian
 1 ATR 72-500
 1 ATR 42-500

References

External links

Flyme

Airlines of the Maldives
Airlines established in 2011
2011 establishments in the Maldives